Denver Morrissey Nicks (born  1985) is an American journalist, photographer and a staff writer for Time magazine.  Nicks' work has appeared in The Nation, The Huffington Post, This Land, and The Daily Beast. He is the author of Private: Bradley Manning, WikiLeaks, and the Biggest Exposure of Official Secrets in American History (2012) and Hot Sauce Nation: America's Burning Obsession (2016).

Nicks is a native of Tulsa, Oklahoma. He currently resides in New York City.

He holds a bachelor's degree in political science and international studies from Southern Methodist University in 2007, and a master's from the Columbia University Graduate School of Journalism in 2010.

References

Further reading
 Miller, Michelle. "Private", CBS News, April 26, 2012; interview with Denver Nicks.

1985 births
Living people
Date of birth missing (living people)
American male journalists
Columbia University Graduate School of Journalism alumni
Southern Methodist University alumni
Writers from Oklahoma